Leuven University Press is a university press located in Leuven, Belgium. It was established in 1971 in association with KU Leuven.  It publishes about forty books a year, with about half being in English or in combined French, German, and Italian, and the other half being in Dutch.

References

External links
 Official website 

University presses of Belgium
Publishing companies established in 1971
KU Leuven
1971 establishments in Belgium